Nigerian Marketplace is a 1981 live album by Oscar Peterson, accompanied by Niels-Henning Ørsted Pedersen and Terry Clarke, recorded at the 1981 Montreux Jazz Festival.

Personnel

Performance 
 Terry Clarke drums
 Niels-Henning Ørsted Pedersen double bass
 Oscar Peterson piano

References 

Oscar Peterson live albums
Albums produced by Norman Granz
1981 live albums
Pablo Records live albums
Albums recorded at the Montreux Jazz Festival